Amy Lynn Lee (born December 13, 1981) is an American singer-songwriter and musician. She is the co-founder, lead vocalist, and lead songwriter of the rock band Evanescence. Alongside her contributions with the band, Lee has also participated on other musical projects, including Nightmare Revisited and Muppets: The Green Album, composed the soundtrack to the films War Story (2014) and Indigo Grey: The Passage (2015) with cellist Dave Eggar, and the song "Speak to Me" for the film Voice from the Stone (2017). She has also collaborated with other artists such as Korn, Seether, Bring Me the Horizon, and Lindsey Stirling. A classically trained pianist, Lee possesses a mezzo-soprano vocal range.

Lee received the Songwriter Icon Award from the National Music Publishers Association in 2008. In 2012, she won Best Vocalist at the Revolver Golden Gods Awards and was also named Rock Goddess of the Year at the Loudwire Music Awards. She was awarded Best Film Score by the Moondance International Film Festival for Indigo Grey: The Passage in 2015. In 2017, she received the Hollywood Music in Media Award for Best Original Song in Independent Film for "Speak to Me". Lee is the American chairperson for the international epilepsy awareness foundation Out of the Shadows.

Early life and education 
Amy Lee was born on December 13, 1981 in Riverside, California, to parents John Lee, who worked as a disc jockey and voice-over artist, and Sara Cargill. The oldest of five siblings, she has two living sisters. Lee had a younger sister who died at age three from an unidentified illness when Lee was six years old, and a younger brother who died in 2018 at age 24 after struggling with severe epilepsy for most of his life. Lee said that when her little sister died, her "whole perception of life changed", and it influenced her rumination on death. She wrote the songs "Hello" from Fallen and "Like You" from The Open Door for her late sister.

Lee discovered a passion for the piano in early childhood. Classical music was her first musical influence as a child, inspiring her to become a musician and composer. She was first inspired by Mozart when she watched the 1984 film Amadeus at eight years old. Beethoven was another early classical inspiration, as well as Danny Elfman's film scores. She wanted to take piano lessons, and studied classical piano for nine years. Lee considers the Lacrimosa movement of Mozart's Requiem her favorite piece of music, and wove it into The Open Door song "Lacrymosa".

Lee began writing poetry about eternity and loneliness at age 10. Her mother had expressed concern about her writing, suggesting she see a therapist. Lee thought about taking antidepressants at the time but chose not to as she felt it would take her "soul away" and she "wouldn't be able to feel anything." One of the first songs she remembered writing was an instrumental piece called "Eternity of the Remorse", writing the sheet music when she was 11. Her first song with lyrics was called "A Single Tear", which she wrote for an eighth-grade assignment, recording it on a cassette tape and playing guitar while her friend from choir did backup vocals.

During her pre-teen years, Lee's family moved to many places, including West Palm Beach, Florida and Rockford, Illinois, eventually settling in Little Rock, Arkansas. When her family moved to Little Rock, Lee had a lot of pent-up "negativity". In Little Rock, she attended Pulaski Academy, a private college preparatory school, starting in junior high. She described the school as a "weird fit" for her, where she was a loner for a while, and experienced bullying for dressing differently, which she would later embrace during high school. Lee found solace in writing, and joining the school choir helped her slowly gain confidence in her voice. She was initially insecure as a singer, and only used singing as a vehicle for her writing. A self-described "choir nerd", Lee became president of her high school's choir, and wrote a choir piece called "Listen to the Rain", which the choir teacher liked and asked her to direct. The piece was performed by the choir in graduation.

Originally wanting to focus on classical or film score composing, Lee's plan changed as her "tastes got darker". In late childhood and throughout her teens, she listened to a variety of musical styles, including alternative music, grunge, hard rock, industrial music, death metal, groove metal, and electronica artists like Bjork and Portishead. Lee's earliest memory of wanting to fuse various musical genres, especially contrasting styles, was when she was training in classical piano and noticed that a "real shreddy" section of a composition from Baroque composer Bach resembled heavy metal. She found "so many similarities to be drawn, almost more so the further out you go on both sides".

Lee's extra-curricular activities involved working on music, playing music with others from school, and freelance painting. She spent most of her free time making music at her house late at night. By age 13, Lee was inspired to form her own band. In 1994, she met budding guitarist Ben Moody when she was 13 at a Christian youth camp; when others in the camp were playing sports, she played piano and he played acoustic guitar and she thought they could play music together. Lee thinks what drew them together at the time was that they "didn't fit in that well" and were "out of [their] element in this silly camp environment."

Career

1995–present: Evanescence 

Within a month of meeting in 1994, Lee showed Moody a cassette tape of her playing guitar and singing a song she wrote. They began playing and working on music at Lee's home, and were soon performing acoustic sets at bookstores and coffee houses in the Little Rock area.

Lee and Moody co-founded Evanescence in 1995. After experimenting with band names, such as Childish Intentions and Stricken, they decided on Evanescence, which means "disappearance" or "fading away". What made Lee want to start a band was "the idea of combinations that were unlikely". With Evanescence, Lee aimed to combine her different musical tastes, "bringing something from the cinematic and classical symphonic world and marrying it to metal, hard rock and alternative music." "There was all this music that was inspiring me. And Evanescence was the product of these two extremes combining".

They eventually recorded three EPs: Evanescence EP (1998), of which about 100 copies were made and distributed at their early live performances; Sound Asleep EP (1999), also known as the Whisper EP; and Mystary EP (2003). Lee and Moody would perform with guest musicians in live gigs, but Evanescence remained a duo. "It was more because that's what we did and how we worked rather than not wanting any other input", Lee recalled.  
 

In 2000, Evanescence recorded the demo CD Origin, which they self-released and sold at local shows. After graduating high school, Lee attended Middle Tennessee State University to study music theory and composition, but dropped out after a semester to focus on Evanescence. Evanescence was signed by Wind Up Records in 2001. Lee and Moody moved to Los Angeles, where they worked on and completed their debut album.

Their debut album Fallen was released in 2003. Most of Lee's writing on the album was inspired by an abusive relationship she was in. Lee later stated that the creation of Fallen largely consisted of her and Moody writing music separately and then adding to each other's work, due to tension and significant creative differences between them. Lee and Moody composed some of the songs on Fallen when they were 15 and 16. In 2003, Lee stated she had opposed the label's initial promotion of the band in the Christian market, which Moody had originally supported and misrepresented the band. She said that Evanescence was not a Christian band and lyrically never had a religious affiliation.

On October 22, 2003, Moody left the band in the middle of the Fallen European tour, citing "creative differences". Moody had previously called the band's management and informed them he was quitting. Lee got a call from their manager asking her to "beg [Moody] to stay", to which she said "that's exactly what he wants me to do" and expressed that if Moody was going to leave, the band "would appreciate it if he'd wait until the end of the tour. But if he can't, then go ahead and go." In an interview several months later, Lee said: "we'd gotten to a point that if something didn't change, we wouldn't have been able to make a second record". She said it was a relief that he left because of tensions created within the band. "It was a really uncomfortable situation for everybody ... completely unstable and unhappy. It was a scary time before he left because I knew something was going to happen and I didn't know what and I was afraid everything we worked for had the potential of going down the toilet." In Lee's termination letter to their manager, she stated that Moody was physically and verbally abusive to her. With Moody gone, "we felt like a weight had been lifted", she said. Guitarist John LeCompt said in a 2006 interview that Lee "gained authority as soon as Ben Moody walked out the door. They had an equal partnership, but he was the man, he had to strangle the band, all the life out of it".

Lee's creative disagreements with Moody included his strict approach to songwriting and focus on commerciality; he would "always be corralling" her ideas, and wanting to push the band in a more commercial, pop direction and she did not. His range of influences were "a lot different" than hers. "It was always a push and pull between us, for me", she said. Fallen "really is a lot of compromise. It definitely leaned toward what he wanted a lot of the time." "A lot of the reason it's been so much fun writing [post-Moody] is that we're not thinking about that. It's like, 'What do we like? What's fun?'", and there is "no pressure of wanting to rule the world", Lee explained. In a 2005 interview, Moody conceded that they had different approaches for the music, stating, "[Amy] is much more creative than I am ... I am a bit more commercial minded ... she is more educated musically, and she wanted to explore that. ... I think in my immaturity at the time, I did that in just a way-too-controlling manner — it was like my way or the highway. We just couldn't meet in the middle, so I was like, "The hell with it." 

Ex-Cold guitarist Terry Balsamo replaced Moody on the Fallen tour, and soon became Evanescence's permanent lead guitarist and Lee's co-writing partner. Lee said that after Balsamo joined, she felt they were "finally a real band, not just Ben and I and a few others thrown together". During the tour, Lee wrote a song titled "The Last Song I'm Wasting on You", recording it in a bathroom on an analog recording device. It became a B-side on the single "Lithium" from Evanescence's second album. When asked if the track was about former bandmate Moody, Lee said, "If I answer that, then I'm not hiding anything anymore. But I just sort of answered it, didn't I?". She later deemed it "one of those personal, hard moments, when beauty is born out of pain". 

After finishing another tour for Evanescence's 2004 live album and DVD Anywhere but Home and overwhelmed by label pressure, Lee retreated to her house, cut off contact with people, and spent the next 10 months writing music again, painting and going to therapy. She said of her first therapy sessions, "For the first, I don't know, lots of sessions, I'd just go in and cry. Every time. I guess I was letting out all the ghosts of my past." Lee found comfort in therapy, an environment where she wasn't being judged, she felt she could speak freely and "not feel that anything I said was wrong". During this time, Lee had invasive experiences with stalkers that forced her to leave her house a couple of nights. This experience led her to write the song "Snow White Queen" from her and a stalker's perspective. Other songs Lee wrote throughout these months included "Lacrymosa" and "Together Again". Lee later collaborated with Balsamo, co-writing music together for Evanescence's second album, The Open Door (2006). The writing experience for The Open Door was "the best process" Lee ever had because she had "free reign" and could "do whatever I wanted without being judged". In 2006, Lee said that when she listened back to Fallen, she "hear[d] all the vulnerability and the fear and all the childish things in me that are just human." While Lee was drowning in the misery of her experiences in Fallen, she said The Open Door is largely about her acknowledging her issues and deliberating "what do I have to do to work this out." In the record, she is "purging the trials", but overall it comes from a less hopeless place and with a more reflective outlook.

After the end of The Open Doors tour, Lee took a break to recollect herself and live life away from the industry. After about 18 months, she began writing music again, and she took harp lessons out of a desire to learn the instrument. In 2009, Evanescence began playing live shows again, with Lee realizing that she missed this part of her life, stating: "I had to get back together with all the guys, and we practiced all the old stuff ... and I enjoyed it so much. I started falling back in love with that part of me, the Evanescence part. I'd kind of been doing everything else, writing-wise, by myself, and I was like, 'Oh yeah, I love this stuff too. Maybe we should all make a record!'" Evanescence released their third studio album, the self-titled Evanescence in 2011. Lee said that the decision for the album's title was her love towards Evanescence, as well as the record being composed more collaboratively than past albums, with all members contributing. The record is "about the band", Lee explained. Its lyrical themes include Lee "falling back in love" with Evanescence, her being inspired by nature and the ocean, brokenness, the quest for freedom, and falling in love. Different from The Open Door, which was "all about me and my personal experiences", Evanescence also includes Lee's musings on events that occurred to others in her life. "But really, whatever makes me feel the most, that's what's on the record, because that's what I need to get off my chest."

After the touring cycle for Evanescence, Lee took an extended break. In October 2013, Wind-up Records sold part of their catalog of artists, including Evanescence and their master recordings, to Bicycle Music Company. In January 2014, it was reported that Lee had filed a lawsuit against Wind-up Records for $1.5 million in unpaid royalties owed to the band. In March 2014, via her Twitter account, Lee announced that she and Evanescence had been released from her Wind-up Records contract and she was now an independent artist; she stated: "Today, for the first time in 13 years, I am a free and independent artist. I have wanted this for so long and I am so happy", adding that this meant she was "free to do anything, Ev[anescence] included."

Following several solo projects by Lee from 2014–2017, including film scoring, and Evanescence's resumed touring in 2015, the band reconvened to work on their fourth studio album, Synthesis. Released in 2017, Synthesis is an album of orchestral and electronica–reworked arrangements of the band's previous material in addition to two new songs. The album's release was followed by the Synthesis Live concert tour in which the band performed with a live orchestra for the first time.

In April 2020, Lee announced the release date of Evanescence's fifth album, The Bitter Truth. Four songs from the album were released as singles throughout 2020 and 2021 during the COVID-19 pandemic, while a virtual live-streamed show was performed by the band from their recording base at Rock Falcon Studio, Nashville, in December 2020. The album was released on March 26, 2021.

In a Q&A with Forbes in May 2020, Lee mentioned that the "image and idea" of the band from the early days was "something that combined multiple dramas, from the dramatic to the rock to the classical to the score", and that although many things have changed since, the "idea that started this whole thing is still there".

2000–present: Solo work

2000–2007: Early solo projects 
Lee performed backup vocals for "Missing You", a song on Big Dismal's 2003 debut album Believe, and sang backup vocals on two songs with supergroup The Damning Well, though her vocals were taken off the final release due to record label issues. Lee later performed a duet with her then-boyfriend Shaun Morgan on the track "Broken" for Seether's 2004 album Disclaimer II. The song is in the soundtrack for the 2004 film The Punisher.

In 2004, Lee said she was working on music for The Chronicles of Narnia: The Lion, the Witch and the Wardrobe, but that the music was rejected by the studio for being "too dark". The producers of Narnia then stated that Evanescence music was never planned for the soundtrack. Lee said that she used part of the instrumental she wrote to segue into the last track of the album, "Good Enough".

Lee became the American chairperson for Out of the Shadows in 2006. This organization is an international foundation with the goal of providing education about epilepsy. Lee's younger brother, Robby, was previously diagnosed with this condition. The singer also made a brief guest appearance in the music video for Johnny Cash's "God's Gonna Cut You Down" in late 2006. As each celebrity featured in the shoot was allowed to choose what they would be doing for the video, Lee chose to appear laying flowers on a grave. Her scene was recorded at Trinity Church in Manhattan, during which she wore a black velvet coat that previously belonged to Tim Burton.

In February 2007, Lee performed with Korn on their song "Freak on a Leash" for MTV Unplugged: Korn. The song was also released as the first single from the album. In November 2007, VH1 produced a mockumentary in the style of Behind the Music, titled Rock Band Cometh: The Rock Band Band Story, to promote the video game Rock Band. She is one of the celebrity cameos featured on the show.

2008–2012: Tribute albums 

In June 2008, the National Music Publishers Association presented Lee with their 2008 Songwriter Icon Award, which "recognizes outstanding songwriters for their personal achievement".

For Walt Disney Records' September 2008 release of Nightmare Revisited, Lee sang a remake of "Sally's Song". The album contains new material and covers of songs from the original Nightmare Before Christmas soundtrack. Lee performed live renditions of "Sally's Song" during the October 17 Nightmare Before Christmas re-release premiere in Hollywood, and for an October 13 appearance on The Tonight Show with Jay Leno.

During an October 2008 interview for Spin.com, Lee noted that she was writing new songs, possibly for a solo album project. Citing influences in folk and Celtic music, she says her current writings feel like she is going back to her "really old" roots. She gave no potential release date, but said of her reason for this new direction, "I need to show that I'm more than a one trick pony."

Lee stated during an October 2008 interview with The Gauntlet that she did not know whether or not she would begin a solo career, saying that she was "at a point where I don't know what is next". She noted that Evanescence was still together as a band but that she found touring to be monotonous. She reiterated that she was continuing to write songs, although she did not yet know what purpose they would serve.

In a Spin interview in March 2010, Lee stated that she was "in a very different creative space then" regarding her previous work on new material, and that while she wrote some good songs, nothing from those efforts would be included in the band's album Evanescence, which was released on October 7, 2011.

In 2011, Lee covered "Halfway Down the Stairs" for Muppets: The Green Album and "I'm So Lonesome I Could Cry" for the tribute album We Walk the Line: A Celebration of the Music of Johnny Cash in 2012.

2013–2015: Aftermath and Recover 
On December 2, 2013, it was announced that Lee had teamed up with American composer Dave Eggar to create music for the American drama film War Story. During an interview with MTV, Lee explained that it would be a "surprise" to her fans; the fact that the film was "dark" and lacking of conversations made it a "beautiful, sad platform for music". She added that for the music she blended various sounds and tones, mostly consisting of keyboard. Speaking about the song "Push the Button" which she originally penned for the movie, Lee explained that it marked a departure for her due to its electronic sound. She added, "I did it all myself, which was crazy, because I'm used to engineering and writing and mixing demos in my house, but being responsible for that being the end product was a new challenge for me." On August 6, Lee announced that the soundtrack album would be called Aftermath and that it would be released on August 25. Lee contributes to all ten tracks, which features Eggar on eight of them and American/Moroccan musician Malika Zarra on one. Lee revealed a 36-second teaser of the album on the same day. It is her first full-length solo album to not involve her band Evanescence.

In March 2015, Lee and Eggar announced that they were recording music, along with Chuck Palmer, for Hammerstep's short film Indigo Grey: The Passage, which was released on September 14, 2015. The film features the songs "Between Worlds" and "Resurrection". Lee composed and recorded "Speak to Me", the title song to Eric D. Howell's 2017 film Voice from the Stone, during August 2015. The accompanying music video was also directed by Howell. It was filmed on October 22, 2015, on the Castle of Celsa estate near Siena, Italy. During a radio interview in July 2015, Lee said that she had been recording cover songs and expressed an interest in releasing them online. On October 27, 2015, she released the first song from the collection with Portishead's 1994 song "It's A Fire", followed by U2's 1987 song "With or Without You" on November 10, 2015, Led Zeppelin's 1971 song "Going to California" on December 1, 2015, and Chris Isaak's 1996 song "Baby Did a Bad, Bad Thing" on December 15, 2015. They are featured on Lee's debut extended play, Recover, Vol. 1, which was released on February 19, 2016. The cover songs are accompanied by music videos directed by Eric Ryan Anderson.

Lee confirmed in an interview with Rolling Stone that she is "definitely working and making music with every intention of people hearing it at this point," as of October 2015. She also stated that she does not have "any news or plans" for new Evanescence music, but assured fans on Twitter that the band has not broken up saying, "We don't follow the rules of a commerce-driven timeline. Inspiration drives us. We're wide open." She later stated during an interview with Loudwire that "there is Evanescence in the future". In December 2015, Lee confirmed that she plans to complete some songs from an Evanescence album (originally produced by Steve Lillywhite) that was rejected by Wind-up Records in 2010. She explained that she was "devastated" and "furious" over the rejection, but was determined to move forward and ended up being "angry enough to write Evanescence's heaviest album", titled Evanescence. Although three songs from the Lillywhite sessions ended up on it, Lee admitted, "I was still left feeling unsatisfied about what I lovingly refer to as my 'broken record'."

2016–present: Dream Too Much and artist collaborations 

On June 17, 2016, Amazon.com announced that Lee was scheduled to release the "family" album Dream Too Much exclusively through Amazon Prime Music. It features "original music for kids and families" and was released on September 30, 2016. The album was a collaboration that involved her father, who is the lead vocalist on "Goodnight My Love", and her sisters.

On September 14, 2016, MTV News reported that Lee had worked on music for the film Blind, starring Alec Baldwin and Demi Moore. The film was premiered at the Woodstock Film Festival on October 13, 2016. On February 10, 2017, Lee released an English-language cover of Francesca Michielin's "L'amore esiste" ("Love Exists"), which she heard while working on a film project in Italy. With Guy Sigsworth as producer and Dave Eggar providing string arrangements, Lee recorded her translated and reinterpreted version of the song over the course of a week at Flux Studios in New York City. In March 2017, the song "Speak to Me" was made available on streaming platforms. It features as the end theme music for the film Voice from the Stone. In 2018, Lee collaborated with Veridia on their single, "I'll Never Be Ready", where she played piano. She stated that collaborating on the song helped her cope with the passing of her brother, Robby.

In 2019 Amy collaborated with Lindsey Stirling on Stirling's 2019 album Artemis on the track and in the music video for "Love goes on and on".

Amy appeared on Body Count's song "When I'm Gone" off their seventh album Carnivore, which was released on March 6, 2020.

On July 31, 2020, American rock band Halestorm re-released their song "Break In", featuring Lee's vocals. The single was included on the Halestorm: Reimagined EP.

On September 19, 2020, Japanese rock band Wagakki Band released a song "Sakura Rising" featuring Lee. The song was written and recorded the day before their orchestral show in Osaka on February 16, 2020, where Lee performed as a guest, but it was finished through file sharing due to the coronavirus pandemic.

On October 30, 2020, Lee featured on the Bring Me the Horizon song "One Day The Only Butterflies Left Will Be In Your Chest As You March Towards Your Death" from their EP Post Human: Survival Horror.

Musical influences 
Lee has cited influence from composers such as Mozart and Danny Elfman, and artists like Björk, Portishead, Massive Attack, Korn, Nine Inch Nails, Tori Amos, Plumb, Radiohead, Shirley Manson, Nirvana, Soundgarden, Pantera, Depeche Mode, Rob Zombie, White Zombie, The Smashing Pumpkins, Pearl Jam, Metallica, and Joan Jett.

Personal life 
Lee was in a relationship with Seether's singer Shaun Morgan from 2003 to 2005. In May 2007, Lee married Josh Hartzler, a therapist and long-time friend. The couple's first child, a son, was born in July 2014.

In the early 2000s, Lee said that she has never been formally religious and does not attend church, but considers herself a Christian. She stated that regardless of her or any band member's beliefs, Evanescence's music has never had a religious or spiritual affiliation.

Public image 

Lee has a recognizable fashion style, marked by her taste for Victorian-styled clothing and occasional use of gothic make-up. She has been labelled a "gothic rock superstar" and a "style icon". She had a piercing on her left eyebrow since she was teenager until 2006; it is visible on the cover of Fallen. Her image was described as "independent and self-assured".

Lee designs many of her own clothes, including those worn in the music video for "Going Under", the dress worn for the cover of The Open Door and the dress she wore to the Nobel Peace Prize Concert in 2011. After she designed the dress she wore at the 2004 Grammy Awards, she chose Japanese designer H. Naoto to make it for her. In 2003, Lee said she wears "lots of funky stuff onstage", and likes to "mix it up" with "two basic elements ... rock, metal and chains and stuff, mixed with fairies and Victorian clothing, fantasy".

Lee explained and showcased some of her wardrobe in 2011, commenting that she would rather make her own clothes because it is hard to find exactly what she wants elsewhere. She likes "asymmetrical things" and "a little bit of chaos" in her outfits, and "when it comes to the band, I want to dress to fit the music." Lee said she used to wear corsets more often in the early years when she wasn't as confident on stage, and it wasn't about "goth" but more about making her feel like "you're about to ride a rollercoaster and you're strapped in and not going to fall out."

Lee has a mezzo-soprano vocal range. In a fan meet & greet, Lee stated she was in the alto section in her school choir and was later told by a vocal coach that her range was higher than an alto.

In 2006, Blender listed Lee as one of the hottest women in rock alongside such singers as Joan Jett, Courtney Love and Liz Phair. In 2013, Lee ranked first in NME.com's "Hottest Women in Music" award.

Discography 

Aftermath (2014, with Dave Eggar)
Recover, Vol. 1 (2016)
Dream Too Much (2016)

Filmography
I Love the New Millennium – Herself
''VH1's 100 Greatest Hard Rock Songs – Herself

Awards and nominations

References

External links 

 
1981 births
20th-century American women singers
21st-century American women singers
American Christians
American women singer-songwriters
American film score composers
American folk-pop singers
American mezzo-sopranos
American multi-instrumentalists
American rock pianists
American rock singers
American rock songwriters
21st-century American women pianists
21st-century American pianists
American women record producers
Christians from California
Evanescence members
Gothic rock musicians
Grammy Award winners
Kerrang! Awards winners
Living people
Middle Tennessee State University alumni
Musicians from Little Rock, Arkansas
Musicians from Riverside, California
NME Awards winners
Record producers from California
Writers from Little Rock, Arkansas
Writers from Riverside, California
20th-century American singers
21st-century American singers
Singer-songwriters from California
Singer-songwriters from Arkansas
Nu metal singers